Maigret is a British television series that ran on ITV for twelve episodes in 1992 and 1993. It is an adaptation of the books by Georges Simenon featuring his fictional French detective Jules Maigret. It aired in the United States on Mystery!.

Production

The programme was filmed in Budapest which doubled for post-WWII France. Airing in two seasons, each of the episodes was based on a single book. The series covered only 12 of Georges Simenon's 75 novels and 28 short stories about the detective.

Cast
 Michael Gambon – Jules Maigret
 Geoffrey Hutchings – Sgt Lucas
 Jack Galloway – Inspector Janvier
 James Larkin – Inspector Lapointe
 Ciaran Madden – Madame Maigret (series 1)
 John Moffatt – M. Comeliau
 Christian Rodska – Moers (three episodes)
 Barbara Flynn – Madame Maigret (series 2)

Episodes

Series 1 (1992)

Series 2 (1993)

Reception
Reviewing the debut episode, Variety called it "clever and soaked with procedure and atmosphere" and noted that the production values were "first class." Two decades later, USA Today called the program "the definitive version" when reviewing the DVD collection. The New Yorker agreed calling this adaptation "the best".

References

External links
 

Television shows based on Belgian novels
1990s British drama television series
ITV television dramas
1992 British television series debuts
1993 British television series endings
British detective television series
Television series by ITV Studios
Television shows produced by Granada Television
English-language television shows
Films shot in Budapest
Films shot in Hungary
Television shows based on works by Georges Simenon
1990s British mystery television series